Ravan Raaj: A True Story is a 1995 Indian Hindi-language action film directed by T. Rama Rao, starring Mithun Chakraborty, Madhoo and Aditya Pancholi and  Harish Kumar. The film is centred on kidney smugglers and a serial killer. The film is a remake of the Tamil blockbuster Pulan Visaranai, starring Vijayakanth. After shifting Ooty, it was Last main-stream film of Mithun Chakraborty as a lead actor which was box office Super hit.

Plot summary
Crime and corruption have taken over Bombay City without any solution. A rash of kidnappings of young women takes place. One auto-rickshaw driver "Auto Kesariya" (Shakti Kapoor) is behind this crime. The policemen of Kala Chowki Police Station are doing little to stop these crimes. Former Assistant Commissioner of Police Arjun Verma (Mithun Chakraborty) is reinstated and assigned to this case. Arjun gets himself deeply involved in this disappearance and the kidnappings and faces the shock and trauma of finding skeletal remains of young women who have been abducted as well as body parts stolen from innocent patients from hospitals. His personal life also turns upside down as his fiancée abandons him on his wedding day, while his niece is abducted and held for ransom, and above all Arjun Verma himself becomes the target of assassins hired by influential politicians and senior police officials.

Cast
Mithun Chakraborty as ACP Arjun Verma
Madhoo as Gayatri
Aditya Pancholi as Dr. Amir Verma
Paresh Rawal as Minister Charandas
Harish Kumar as Harish
Sheeba Akashdeep as Shilpa
Shakti Kapoor as Auto Kesariya
Johnny Lever as Chamelibahen
Alok Nath as Police Commissioner Deepak Seth
Ishrat Ali as Devdas
Harish Patel as Shilpa's father
Ghanshyam Rohera as Eunuch
Tej Sapru as Police Inspector Madanlal
Baby Sonia  Dolly (Twins Appearance) / Roli
Narra Venkateswara Rao as Arjun's superior

Soundtrack

The movie has six songs composed by Viju Shah which are, to some extent, significant until date. With Tips JHANKAR "Husnwaalon Se Yeh Dil Bachaaye" by Udit Narayan in his archetypal upbeat style, the catchy number "Yaar Mere Mausam Hai Mastaana Mastaana" suggestive of romance in fine weather are some well-known euphonious songs of the album. Voices for the songs were rendered by  Kumar Sanu, Sadhana Sargam, Sapna Mukherjee, Abhijeet Bhattacharya, Udit Narayan, Kavita Krishnamurthy, Bali Brahmbhatt and Poornima, with lyrics by the eminent lyricist Anand Bakshi.

"Husnwalo Se Ye Dil Bachaye" - Udit Narayan   
"Aaina Aaina Tere Bin Chaina" - Kumar Sanu, Jayshree Shivram    
"Ooh! Ooh! Ooh... Oah!" - Bali Brahmabhatt, Poornima
"O Sanam O Sanam" - Kumar Sanu, Sadhana Sargam
"Tu Cheez Badi Hai Sakht Sakht" - Bali Brahmabhatt, Johny Lever, Sapna Mukherjee
"Yaar Mera Mausam Hai Mastana Mastana" - Abhijeet Bhattacharya, Kavita Krishnamurthy

References

External links
 

1995 films
1990s Hindi-language films
Hindi remakes of Tamil films
Films directed by T. Rama Rao
Films scored by Viju Shah
Mithun's Dream Factory films
Cross-dressing in Indian films
Films shot in Ooty
Films shot in Mumbai